The 2005 CONCACAF Gold Cup Final was a soccer match to determine the winners of the 2005 CONCACAF Gold Cup. The match was held at Giants Stadium in East Rutherford, New Jersey, on July 24, 2005. It was contested by the winners of the semi-finals, United States and Panama. The game would end in a 0–0 draw after extra time, leading to a penalty shoot-out which the United States would win 3–1 with the decisive kick coming from Brad Davis.

Route to the final

Match

References

External links
 Official website 

Final
CONCACAF Gold Cup finals
CONCACAF Gold Cup Final
CONCACAF Gold Cup Final
CONCACAF Gold Cup Final 2005
United States men's national soccer team matches
Panama national football team matches
Sports competitions in East Rutherford, New Jersey
CONCACAF Gold Cup Final
CONCACAF Gold Cup Final
21st century in East Rutherford, New Jersey
Soccer in New Jersey
Meadowlands Sports Complex